Kryve is a small village (selo) in Stryi Raion, Lviv Oblast, of Western Ukraine.  It belongs to Kozova rural hromada, one of the hromadas of Ukraine. The population of the village has only 287 persons and Local government is administered by Dovzhkivska village council.

Geography 

History and Attractions 
The date is considered the founding of the village is in 1500. The active settlement of the Skole region and the village Kryve is observed in the 16th century (1578). 
In the village has an architectural monument of local importance of Stryi Raion — Church of St. Onuphrius (wooden) of the 18th century, (1494-М).

Until 18 July 2020, Kryve belonged to Skole Raion. The raion was abolished in July 2020 as part of the administrative reform of Ukraine, which reduced the number of raions of Lviv Oblast to seven. The area of Skole Raion was merged into Stryi Raion.

External links 
 weather.in.ua/Kryve (Skolivs'kyi district)

References 

Villages in Stryi Raion